Out of the Shadow (also known as Murder on the Campus) is a 1961 British thriller film directed by Michael Winner and starring Terence Longdon, Donald Gray, Diane Clare, Robertson Hare and Dermot Walsh.

Plot
Reporter Mark Kingston learns that his brother, who was studying at Cambridge University, is reported to have committed suicide. Unconvinced, he begins his own investigation when the police dismiss his suspicions. With the help of Mary Johnson, whose professor father has gone missing, Kingston attempts to prove that there has been a murder and not a suicide on the campus.

Cast
 Terence Longdon as Mark Kingston 
 Diane Clare as Mary Johnson
 Donald Gray as Inspector Wills  
 Robertson Hare as Ronald Fortescue 
 Dermot Walsh as Professor Taylor 
 Felicity Young as Waitress 
 Douglas Muir as Killer

Review
The reviewer for Kine Weekly wrote: "The tale is a bit involved but the characters, adequately portrayed, are briskly shuffled, its light relief is apt, the romantic asides are agreeable, and it ends on a lively, if hardly unexpected, note. What’s more, the backgrounds are authentic. Safe quota 'second'."

DVD release
The film was released under the name of Murder on the Campus on DVD in the UK in October 2013, in a two-film collection with the thriller, Final Appointment (1954).

References

External links

Out of the Shadow at Letterbox DVD

1961 films
1960s thriller films
British thriller films
1960s English-language films
Films directed by Michael Winner
Films with screenplays by Michael Winner
Films set in Cambridge
Films set in universities and colleges
1960s British films